Percy Francis Joseph Martini (4 June 1888 – 1 July 1961) was an Australian rules footballer who played for Geelong in the Victorian Football League (VFL).

Family
He married May Victoria Machar (1887–1928) in 1913.

Football
A full-forward, from 1909 until 1919 he was Geelong's leading goalkicker in every season except 1915. In 1916, the club did not take part in the competition due to the war, and Martini played with Richmond for the season and topped their goalkicking.

With 51 goals in 1910, he became the first Geelong player to kick over 50 goals in a season, and it was the biggest tally in the league for the year, posthumously earning a Leading Goalkicker Medal for his efforts. When he retired in 1920 he had managed to kick 333 goals for Geelong which at the time was a club record.

Footnotes

References
 Hogan P: The Tigers of Old, Richmond FC, Melbourne 1996

External links

 Percy Martini, at Boyles Football Photos

1888 births
1961 deaths
Australian rules footballers from Melbourne
Australian Rules footballers: place kick exponents
Geelong Football Club players
Richmond Football Club players
VFL Leading Goalkicker Medal winners
People from Hawthorn, Victoria